Benjamin Kennedy (born December 26, 1991) is an American motorsports executive, professional stock car racing team owner, and former driver. He currently serves as NASCAR's Senior Vice President of Racing Development and Strategy.

Executive career

General manager of Truck Series
On January 30, 2018, Kennedy was named General Manager of the Camping World Truck Series. Kennedy spent one season in the position before transitioning to a strategic-based role.

NASCAR front office
In January 2019, Kennedy was hired  by NASCAR to be a part of the racing operations team as well as help develop the sport internationally. He was promoted a year later when he became the Vice President of Racing Development, and promoted again in July 2020 as the Vice President of Strategic Initiatives, where he oversaw racing development initiatives for all three national series. In June 2021, he named the Senior Vice President of Strategy and Innovation, where he reports directly to Steve Phelps, the President of NASCAR.

Kennedy is currently tasked with creating the schedule for the three top series of the sport. It was in this position that he helped craft the idea of the Busch Light Clash at The Coliseum, which saw a pre-season race being held at the Los Angeles Memorial Coliseum. According to NASCAR, he is the "point man" of the schedule.

On March 10, 2022, NASCAR announced that Kennedy would be promoted in the company, with his new title being the Senior Vice President of Racing Development and Strategy.

Racing career

Kennedy began his racing career on the short tracks of central Florida, winning championships in Super Late Models at Orlando Speedworld, and in Pro Truck racing at Orlando Speedworld and New Smyrna Speedway. He made his touring series debut in the K&N Pro Series East in 2010 and began racing the series full-time in 2011.

In 2012, in addition to running the full K&N Pro Series East schedule, Kennedy competed in the first Euro Racecar Series event competed under NASCAR sanctioning, winning the event at Tours Speedway, the first NASCAR race held on an oval in Europe.

After finishing ninth in series points in 2012, Kennedy was named by Fox Sports as one of NASCAR's "drivers 25 and under to watch" in January 2013. In April 2013, Kennedy won his first career race in the K&N Pro Series East, in the series' first race held at Five Flags Speedway in Kennedy's native Florida. Kennedy also announced that he would be driving a truck prepared by Turner Scott Motorsports in three Camping World Truck Series races in the 2013 season, running in events at Bristol Motor Speedway, Iowa Speedway and Homestead-Miami Speedway; he ran a total of five races, posting a best finish of fourth at Martinsville Speedway. He was named the K&N Pro Series East's Most Popular Driver for the 2013 season.

In December 2013, it was announced that Kennedy would drive the No. 31 Chevrolet Silverado full-time in the 2014 NASCAR Camping World Truck Series season for Turner Scott Motorsports, competing for Rookie of the Year. He got 8 top tens and won ROTY honors. The team closed at the end of the season.

In December 2014, it was announced that Kennedy would move to Red Horse Racing, driving the No. 11 Local Motors Toyota Tundra.

On July 9, 2015, with seven laps to go in Kentucky, Kennedy was clipped by David Gilliland into the fence where the back of his truck received hard damage, causing the race to be red-flagged and eventually ended prematurely with five laps left, though he was uninjured.

On February 14, 2016, he announced his return to Red Horse Racing with new sponsor JACOB Companies. However, on April 15, RHR announced Kennedy had parted ways with the team. Ten days later, Kennedy joined GMS Racing to drive the No. 33 Chevrolet Silverado. On August 17, 2016, after a falter by both Daniel Suárez and William Byron, he won the August Bristol race after a duel with Brett Moffitt. By virtue of that win, he qualified for the inaugural Truck Series Chase. Kennedy advanced to the Round of 6 from the Round of 8 but was eliminated following the Lucas Oil 150. He finished seventh in points.

Also during the 2016 season, Kennedy started his first career Xfinity Series race, driving the No. 2 Richard Childress Racing Chevrolet at Iowa Speedway. He started sixth and finished tenth.

On February 6, 2017, it was announced that Kennedy would drive nine races for Richard Childress Racing in the Xfinity Series, splitting time in the No. 2 entry with Austin Dillon and Paul Menard. Kennedy received at least one offer to drive in the Monster Energy NASCAR Cup Series in that offseason from an undisclosed team, as well as other offers, but took the part-time ride and advice that comes with being around an established Cup organization. He later expanded his schedule with a twelve-race agreement to drive the No. 96 car for GMS Racing.

Team ownership

Ben Kennedy fielded a NASCAR K&N Pro Series East and K&N Pro Series West team. The team started fielding the No. 96 Chevrolet part-time for Ben Kennedy in the K&N East in 2010. In 2011 and 2012, the team became full-time in the East and part-time in the K&N West, and in the West, the car was a Toyota. In 2013, the team only fielded the K&N East full-time and made two races in Camping World Truck Series with a 15th best team's finish at Iowa. In 2014, with Ben Kennedy moving to compete full-time in the Camping World Truck series for Turner Scott Motorsports, Kenzie Ruston raced full-time in the No. 96 in the K&N East. In 2015, the team moved to Toyota and renumbered the car to No. 3 to Kaz Grala in both K&N Pro Series East and K&N Pro Series West. Ben Kennedy also made one start in K&N West in the old No. 96. In 2016, Grala returned to a part-time schedule in the K&N East. In 2017, the No. 96 returned for Spencer Davis and a second car appeared in the form of the No. 20 for Anthony Sergi. 

In 2021, Kennedy fielded the No. 43 Chevrolet in the ARCA Menards Series East for Daniel Dye. However, Dye left for GMS Racing mid-season and another driver did not replace him in the No. 43. Kennedy has not fielded a car in the series since then. However, the team continues to field the No. 43 for Daniel Dye in various late model racing events.

Personal life
Kennedy is the son of Lesa France Kennedy and the late Dr. Bruce Kennedy,   who died in a 2007 plane crash. He is the grandson of Bill France Jr. and great-grandson of Bill France Sr., the founder of NASCAR. He is a 2014 graduate of the University of Florida, with a degree in sports management. In 2017, Kennedy participated in an episode of American Ninja Warrior which was filmed at Daytona International Speedway.

Motorsports career results

NASCAR
(key) (Bold – Pole position awarded by qualifying time. Italics – Pole position earned by points standings or practice time. * – Most laps led.)

Xfinity Series

Camping World Truck Series

K&N Pro Series East

K&N Pro Series West

 Season still in progress
 Ineligible for series points

References

External links

Living people
1991 births
Sportspeople from Daytona Beach, Florida
Racing drivers from Florida
NASCAR drivers
University of Florida alumni
France family
American Ninja Warrior contestants
Richard Childress Racing drivers
Auto racing executives